Monique Hirovanaa (born 25 May 1966) is a former female rugby union player. She was in the squad that won the 1998 Women's Rugby World Cup and the 2002 Women's Rugby World Cup.

In 2018, Hirovanaa was inducted into the Ōtara Sports Hall of Fame at the Ōtara Sports Awards on 1 December at Kia Aroha College.

References

External links
Black Ferns Profile

1966 births
Living people
New Zealand women's international rugby union players
New Zealand female rugby union players
Female rugby union players
Rugby union players from Auckland